Istiblennius steindachneri is a species of combtooth blenny found in the western Indian ocean. The identity of the person honoured in this blenny's specific name was not stated by Pfeffer in his description but it is almost certainly the Austrian ichthyologist Franz Steindachner (1834-1919).

References

steindachneri
Fish described in 1893